James McKie was a Scottish footballer who played as a full-back for Southampton St. Mary's in 1896–97, when they won the Southern League title for the first of six occasions over the next eight years.

Football career
McKie was born in Dalry, a small town in Ayrshire, Scotland and had served in the 15th Company Royal Artillery. He had been a member of the Freemantle football team before being signed by Southampton St. Mary's in the summer of 1896.

He made his debut for the "Saints" at the County Ground in the opening match of the 1896–97 season, a 4–1 victory over Chatham. He played at left-back with his fellow Scotsmen Donald McKay at right-back and William McMillan at right-half. McKay retained his place for a further two games, before being replaced by Samuel Meston, who had moved back to accommodate Willie Naughton on the right wing. McKie had a further run of three matches, when he took over from McKay in December and January. Described as "tough and rugged", McKie also played in six of the seven FA Cup matches in which the "Saints" reached the Second Round Proper for the first time, going out to Newton Heath after a replay.

The Saints won the first nine games of the season and finished unbeaten in the league after twenty matches, thus claiming the Southern League title for the first time.

In the summer of 1897, McKie moved to Kent with spells for fellow Southern League teams Chatham and Dartford.

Honours
Southampton St. Mary's
Southern League champions: 1896–97

References

1873 births
Year of death missing
Scottish footballers
Association football defenders
Freemantle F.C. players
Southampton F.C. players
Chatham Town F.C. players
Dartford F.C. players
Southern Football League players
Footballers from North Ayrshire
Royal Artillery soldiers
19th-century British Army personnel
People from Dalry, North Ayrshire